Stewart Manor (Charles B. Sommers House) is a historic home located at Indianapolis, Marion County, Indiana.  It was built in 1923–1924, and is a large -story, irregularly massed stone mansion.  It features a drive through front portico and rounded and segmental arched openings. The house has a shingled gable roof with rounded corners reminiscent of a Medieval English Country Manor.

It was added to the National Register of Historic Places in 1976.

References

External links

Houses on the National Register of Historic Places in Indiana
Houses completed in 1924
Houses in Indianapolis
National Register of Historic Places in Indianapolis